The Subprefecture of Capela do Socorro is one of 32 subprefectures of the city of São Paulo, Brazil.  It comprises three districts: Socorro, Grajaú, and Cidade Dutra.

This is the most populous subprefecture of São Paulo, with a total population of 672,901 inhabitants according to the census of 2010. It hosts the Interlagos Circuit, which receives yearly the Formula One Brazilian Grand Prix and also the only beach inside the municipality of São Paulo, in the margins of the Guarapiranga Dam.

Public Equipment 
 99th Military Service Board Capela do Socorro
 27th Metropolitan Military Police Battalion

See also
 Roman Catholic Diocese of Santo Amaro
 Line 9 (CPTM) Paulista Metropolitan Trains Company
 Socorro (CPTM) Train station
 Autódromo (CPTM) Train station
 Primavera-Interlagos (CPTM) Train station
 Grajaú (CPTM) Train station
 Mendes-Vila Natal (CPTM) Train station
 Interlagos Racetrack

References

External links
 Subprefecture of Capela do Socorro
 Roman Catholic Diocese of Santo Amaro
 Official page of the Paulista Metropolitan Trains Company
 Interlagos Racetrack

Subprefectures of São Paulo